Henry Seymour later Portman (c. 1637–1728), of Orchard Portman, Somerset, was an English politician who sat in the House of Commons of England and then Great Britain almost continually between 1679 and 1715.

Early life

Seymour was the fifth son of Sir Edward Seymour, 3rd Baronet. He joined the Army and was an ensign in the  garrison at Guernsey by 1662, a lieutenant of foot in 1669 and captain in the Duke of Buckingham's Foot from 1672 to 1673. He married as his first wife Penelope Haslewood, daughter of Sir William Haslewood of Maidwell, Northamptonshire.

Political career
Seymour was returned unopposed as Member (MP)  for St Mawes in March 1679 and was returned again in elections in October 1679, 1681, 1685 and 1689. He was commissioner for assessment for Dorset from 1689 to 1690. In 1690 he inherited the estates in Somerset and Dorset of his cousin Sir William Portman and assumed the surname of Portman.
 
(Seymour) Portman was returned unopposed as MP for Totnes at the 1690 general election, but did not stand there in 1695. He was deputy lieutenant of Somerset from 1691 and Somerset and Dorset from 1702, and was also JP for Somerset and Devon. He was returned unopposed as MP for St Mawes in a by-election on 21 November 1696. He was elected MP for Taunton at the  1698 general election and again in January 1701. In February 1702 he was returned unopposed as MP for Wells and held the seat for three more elections until 1708. In 1703 he was appointed  keeper for Hyde Park a position he held until his death. At the 1708 general election he was returned unopposed as MP for Somerset. He was elected MP for Taunton again at the 1710 general election, was returned unopposed in 1713 but was unseated on petition after the 1715 general election and never regained his seat.

Later life and legacy
Portman made a second marriage at the age of 77 to Meliora Fitch, daughter of John Fitch, Grocer of London and Lower Henbury, Dorset on 31 July 1714. He died without issue from either marriage on 23 February 1728, said to be aged 93. His estates passed under the entail via his brother Edward Seymour to the descendants of his cousin Edward Berkeley.

References

1637 births
1728 deaths
People from Somerset
Younger sons of baronets
English MPs 1679
English MPs 1680–1681
English MPs 1681
English MPs 1685–1687
English MPs 1689–1690
English MPs 1690–1695
English MPs 1695–1698
English MPs 1698–1700
English MPs 1701–1702
English MPs 1702–1705
English MPs 1705–1707
Members of the Parliament of England (pre-1707) for Totnes
British MPs 1707–1708
British MPs 1708–1710
British MPs 1713–1715